The Simpsons: Bart's Nightmare is a 1992 video game developed by American company Sculptured Software based on the television show The Simpsons. The game, split into two parts, follows Bart on the street, trying to find his homework pages. The second part of the game consists of minigames. It was released on the SNES and the Sega Genesis. A sequel, Virtual Bart, was released in 1994. Production conflicts resulted in American game designer Bill Williams to leave the video game industry. The game received reviews from critics such as Entertainment Weekly and Super Gamer.

Gameplay

The game is split in two parts. The first is set on a street (probably Evergreen Terrace, but referred to as Windy World). Bart walks around and has to find pages of his homework while avoiding enemies such as living post boxes and various characters from the show. Power-ups that Bart can collect include bubble gum (with which he can blow bubbles to repel enemies or collect floating blue Zs to restore his health), watermelon seeds (which he can spit at enemies to defeat them or make them change direction), pillows (which create a new health bar for him if he runs out of Zs), and his skateboard (which temporarily increases his speed as well as restoring and extending his health bar the longer he is on it). Jimbo and his gang will coerce Bart into strolling with them, causing Bart to lose control of his movements and have to move with them, taking damage as he does. Hitting a flying saxophone will summon Lisa Simpson with pixie wings to sprinkle fairy dust on Jimbo and his gang and transform them into rats, freeing Bart. However, if Bart is by himself, the Lisa pixie will turn him into a frog who cannot attack. If Bart catches a kiss blown to him by an old lady, it will revert him to his human form.

Principal Skinner occasionally appears and tries to dress Bart in his Sunday school suit. If the player walks into Skinner, Bart will change appearance and become very slow and not be able to fire at enemies; however, the suit will also protect Bart from taking damage from all enemies (save for Jimbo and his gang). The suit wears off after a certain amount of time, or when Bart jumps in a mud puddle.

When a page is found in Windy World, the player can jump onto it, where Bart will shrink down on the page, and the player has to choose one out of a selection of two randomly chosen minigames. The player must point Bart to one of the two color-coded doors to play a minigame and retrieve a lost page of Bart's homework. The doors and games are:

 The green door: Bartzilla, a two-part minigame where Bart must stomp through the streets of Springfield and destroy the army with fire breath and visual lasers. After being zapped by a shrink ray, Bart climbs the Springfield State Building and fights "Homer Kong" and "Momthra."
 The violet door: A journey into Bart's bloodstream, where Bart must use an air pump to inflate and destroy germs and collect five Smilin' Joe Fissions (a character from the first-season episode "Homer's Odyssey").
 The yellow door: Itchy and Scratchy, where Bart is being attacked by the "team up" duo, as well as various other household objects that become enemies (the oven and vacuum cleaners shoot fire, the telephone explodes, Marge's picture drops eyeballs, etc.). All fire-based attacks are instantly fatal, with Bart crumbling to ashes. This is the only minigame divided into two separate parts; Bart must locate another page in Windy World before playing the second minigame.
 The blue door: Bartman, where Bart flies over Springfield as a superhero. Along the way he fights many bosses, including Sherri and Terri in a hot air balloon, Barney Gumble on a pink elephant, Waylon Smithers in a blimp (Bart faces him twice), and eventually Mr. Burns in a biplane. Not only must he avoid the enemies, Bart must avoid clouds of radioactive gas. Bart also receives bottled Squishees from Apu on a magic carpet in this level, which serves to raise his energy bar.
 The orange door: Idaho Simpson, where Bart must make his way through the balancing columns in "Temple of Maggie". There are two stages, each with a page reward at the end.

The minigames can be played in any order; the pages awarded will be 1 through 8 depending on the order they were retrieved.

Upon either failing the respective minigame (and not getting the page back) or completing the minigame (and receiving the page as a reward), the screen will flash back to Bart's room at night, which shows the number of points the player has and the number of pages collected, while Bart snores. Once a minigame is completed, it cannot be played again. Both doors will be the same color if there is only one minigame to complete.

The game ends when Bart loses all of his Zs (Windy World will be covered in a white fog, suggesting Bart's nightmare is nearly over) and takes damage one more time, or if he successfully completes all the minigames. Depending on how many pages Bart retrieves and how many points he gets, he is awarded a letter grade. Bart will hold it up for the player to see, and then slightly different endings are shown where the players sees the Simpson family's reactions to Bart's grade by having the paper affixed to the refrigerator, which is strikingly similar to the final scene in "Bart Gets an 'F'. If Bart is given an "F", the worst grade, the entire family is mad at him except Maggie, with slightly higher grades having at least Homer pleased with Bart's work. Lisa is always annoyed with Bart's work unless the player manages to get Bart an outstanding grade, in which case she will look at Bart's paper in disbelief.

This minigame-oriented gameplay gives the game an arcade style. Although much of the game could be categorized as a platformer, some of the minigames could fit in the shoot-em-up genre, particularly the Bartman and Bartzilla stages.

Plot
Bart Simpson falls asleep while studying and dreams of a strange universe where TVs and fairies roam the streets. The player must find Bart's lost homework and progress through the various levels to keep the homework pages and eventually wake up.

Production
Company meddling during the development of the game prompted Bill Williams, the game's designer, to leave the video game industry.

Reception

Entertainment Weekly wrote that "Falling asleep while doing his homework, Bart has to battle with the demons of his subconscious—imagining himself as, among others, a rampaging green Bartzilla and a caped Bartman. A surreal blast." Super Gamer reviewed the SNES version and gave a review score of 73% writing: "It looks as good as the cartoon, but sadly playability is irritatingly tough and not as imaginative as the graphics."

References

External links
 Bart's Nightmare on GameFAQs

1992 video games
Acclaim Entertainment games
Platform games
Video games based on The Simpsons
Sega Genesis games
Super Nintendo Entertainment System games
Video games about children
Video games about nightmares
Video games set in the United States
Video games developed in the United States
Single-player video games